Ropica vinacea is a species of beetle in the family Cerambycidae. It was described by Pascoe in 1865. It is known from Borneo, Sumatra, and Malaysia.

References

vinacea
Beetles described in 1865